In law, rendition is a "surrender" or "handing over" of persons or property, particularly from one jurisdiction to another. For criminal suspects, extradition is the most common type of rendition. Rendition can also be seen as the act of handing over, after the request for extradition has taken place.

Rendition can also mean the act of rendering, i.e. delivering, a judicial decision, or of explaining a series of events, as a defendant or witness. It can also mean the execution of a judicial order by the directed parties. But extraordinary rendition is distinct from both deportation and extradition, being inherently illegal.

United States

Interstate rendition 

Rendition between states is required by Article Four, Section Two of the United States Constitution; this section is often termed the rendition clause.

Each state has a presumptive duty to render suspects on the request of another state, as under the full faith and credit clause. The Supreme Court has established certain exceptions; a state may allow its own legal proceedings against a suspect to take precedence, for example. It was established in Kentucky v. Dennison that interstate rendition and extradition were not a federal writ; that is, a state could not petition the federal courts to have another state honor its request for rendition, if the state receiving the request chose not to do so. If the State failed to request federal intervention, but relied on other argument for the rendition, the Hatfield/McCoy feud produced the case of Mahon v. Justice, holding there is "no comity between the states by which a person held upon an indictment for a criminal offense in one state can be turned over to the authorities of another state, although abducted from the latter." The Uniform Extradition Act may nullify this result in those States that have adopted it.

In rare cases, usually involving the death penalty, states have refused or delayed rendition. In 1987, this was overturned by Puerto Rico v. Branstad, so a federal interest in resolving interstate rendition disputes was established. Nevertheless, the right of refusal of rendition was not overturned.

Extradition for fugitives who are charged with a crime is commonly requested by state or county prosecutors. Formal interstate rendition will involve both state governors. Other procedures can involve waiving documentary formalities before surrender of the fugitive. Under the Uniform Extradition Act adopted in 48 states, Puerto Rico and the Virgin Islands (but not in Mississippi and South Carolina), there is a distinction between fugitives who were in the demanding state at the time of the crime and those nonfugitives whose prior presence is not so alleged. The first type is mandatory under the United States Constitution. The less frequent second type allows for some Gubernatorial discretion. These cases can involve bad checks or failure to pay child support but they still must be criminal matters.

Bounty hunters and bondsmen once had unlimited authority to capture fugitives, even outside the state where they were wanted by the courts. When they deliver such a person, this is considered rendition, as it did not involve the intervention of the justice system in the state of capture. Under more recent law, bounty hunters are not legally permitted to act outside of the state where the offense took place, but cases of rendition still take place due to the financial interest the bondsmen have in returning a fugitive and recovering from the bail bond forfeiture. Formally, such fugitive cases should be turned over to the state for execution under the Uniform Criminal Extradition Act (1936) and the Uniform Extradition and Rendition Act (1980), if the fugitive's location is known, or the United States Marshals Service, when it is not.

Before attempting to apprehend a bail fugitive in the State of California who has fled bail from another state, a bounty hunter or bail bondsman must adhere to the provisions set forth in California Penal Code Section 847.5.

California Penal Code Section 847.5
Fugitive admitted to bail in another state; affidavit; hearing; warrant for arrest; order for return

If a person has been admitted to bail in another state, escapes bail, and is present in this State, the bail bondsman or other person who is bail for such fugitive, may file with a magistrate in the county where the fugitive is present an affidavit stating the name and whereabouts of the fugitive, the offense with which the alleged fugitive was charged or of which he was convicted, the time and place of same, and the particulars in which the fugitive has violated the terms of his bail, and may request the issuance of a warrant for arrest of the fugitive, and the issuance, after hearing, of an order authorizing the affiant to return the fugitive to the jurisdiction from which he escaped bail.  The magistrate may require such additional evidence under oath as he deems necessary to decide the issue.  If he concludes that there is probable cause for believing that the person alleged to be a fugitive is such, he may issue a warrant for his arrest.  The magistrate shall notify the district attorney of such action and shall direct him to investigate the case and determine the facts of the matter.  When the fugitive is brought to him pursuant to the warrant, the magistrate shall set a time and place for hearing, and shall advise the fugitive of his right to counsel and to produce evidence at the hearing.  He may admit the fugitive to bail pending the hearing.  The district attorney shall appear at the hearing.  If, after hearing, the magistrate is satisfied from the evidence that the person is a fugitive he may issue an order authorizing affiant to return the fugitive to the jurisdiction from which he escaped bail.  A bondsman or other person who is bail for a fugitive admitted to bail in another state who takes the fugitive into custody, except pursuant to an order issued under this section, is guilty of a misdemeanor.

Special provisions exist for sworn peace officers in regards to apprehending a fugitive in the State of California, who has fled from another state as outlined in California Penal Code Sections 1551 and 1551.1

California Penal Code Section 1551
Complaint against fugitive; magistrate's warrant; attaching certified copy of complaint and affidavit to warrant

(a) Whenever any person within this State is charged by a verified complaint before any magistrate of this State with the commission of any crime in any other State, or, with having been convicted of a crime in that State and having escaped from confinement, or having violated the terms of his bail, probation or parole; or (b) whenever complaint is made before any magistrate in this State setting forth on the affidavit of any credible person in another State that a crime has been committed in such other State and that the accused has been charged in such State with the commission of the crime, or that the accused has been convicted of a crime in that State and has escaped from bail, probation or parole and is believed to be in this State; then the magistrate shall issue a warrant directed to any peace officer commanding him to apprehend the person named therein, wherever he may be found in this State, and to bring him before the same or any other magistrate who is available in or convenient of access to the place where the arrest is made.  A certified copy of the sworn charge or complaint and affidavit upon which the warrant is issued shall be attached to the warrant.

California Penal Code Section 1551.1
Arrest without warrant; grounds; taking prisoner before magistrate; complaint

The arrest of a person may also be lawfully made by any peace officer, without a warrant, upon reasonable information that the accused stands charged in the courts of any other state with a crime punishable by death or imprisonment for a term exceeding one year, or that the person has been convicted of a crime punishable in the state of conviction by imprisonment for a term exceeding one year and thereafter escaped from confinement or violated the terms of his or her bail, probation or parole.  When so arrested the accused shall be taken before a magistrate with all practicable speed and complaint shall be made against him or her under oath setting forth the ground for the arrest as in Section 1551.

Rendition was infamously used to recapture fugitive slaves, who under the Constitution and various federal laws had virtually no human rights. As the movement for abolition grew, Northern states increasingly refused to comply or cooperate with rendition of escaped slaves, leading to the Fugitive Slave Law of 1850. This non-cooperation was behind the longstanding principle of refusal, only reverted in the 1987 decision.

Irregular rendition
American use of “irregular rendition” is a familiar alternative to extradition, and it is the same process as extraordinary rendition. It involves kidnapping or deceit. In the view of the United States, kidnapping a defendant overseas and returning him to the United States for trial does not remove jurisdiction from American courts unless an applicable extradition treaty explicitly calls for that result.

Example cases 
This is a non-exhaustive list of some alleged examples of irregular rendition.

 John Surratt, 1866
The United States exercised extraterritorial jurisdiction over John Surratt, a possible co-conspirator in the assassination of President Abraham Lincoln. Law enforcement officers returned Surratt to the United States I 1866 after he had fled to Alexandria, Egypt.

 Frederick Ker, 1886 
A Pinkerton agent, Henry Julian, was hired by the federal government to collect larcenist Frederick Ker, who had fled to Peru. Although Julian had the necessary extradition papers, he found that there was no official to meet his request due to the recent Chilean military occupation of Lima. Rather than return home empty-handed, Julian kidnapped the fugitive, with assistance from Chilean forces, and placed him on a U.S. vessel heading back to the United States.

 Shirley Collins, 1952

Shirley Collins was abducted from a bus station in Chicago, Illinois due to being a suspect in a murder case in Michigan. The authorities from Michigan went to Illinois and forcibly abducted the defendant to take him back to Michigan to get tried for the murder. He claimed that he was forcibly seized, handcuffed and blackjacked (being hit by a short leather club) by the Chicago authorities. Upon being taken to the Chicago police department he was denied counsel and blackjacked again when he refused to return to Michigan to be tried, this time it was by the Michigan and Chicago authorities.

 Francisco Toscanino, 1974 
Francisco Toscanino was forcibly abducted from Italy and taken back to the US, due to being accused of intent to smuggle narcotics into the United States. Uruguayan police forcibly abducted the Italian and gave him to the American authorities.

 Julio Juventino Lujan, 1975 
In Lujan, the defendant was abducted in a foreign country and brought to the United States to face prosecution for a narcotics violation. Lujan attacked the court's jurisdiction over his person based upon the manner in which he was apprehended.

 Dan Davis (writer), 2007
Davis was a fugitive from the United States for more than 10 years when he was kidnapped in Venezuela by paramilitary forces and turned over to the United States Homeland Security at the airport and flown to Miami and turned over to the US Marshals Service for sentencing from his original drug charges.

Extraordinary rendition 
 
Human rights groups charge that extraordinary rendition is a violation of Article 3 of the United Nations Convention Against Torture (UNCAT), because suspects are taken to countries where torture during interrogation remains common, thus circumventing the protections the captives would enjoy in the United States or nations who abide by the terms of UNCAT.  Its legality remains highly controversial, as the United States outlaws the use of torture, and the U.S. Constitution guarantees due process. Rendered suspects are denied due process because they are arrested without charges, deprived of legal counsel, and illegally transferred to a third world country with the intent and purpose of facilitating torture and other interrogation measures which would be illegal in the USA.

Other uses
Two "reform school" groups, the Aspen Education Group and WWASP, have been accused of using a contractor to kidnap teenagers from their homes or in public, to transport them to facilities around the world. Many of the youth who spent time in these schools have spoken of being abducted during the night, while outside with friends, and (in one case) staying at their boyfriend's house. The most famous of these companies is called Strawn Support Services and has agents working in every state of the US as well as in Latin American countries where WWASP schools are located. These agents often carry weapons such as tasers, mace, and occasionally firearms during transports.

See also
Ratlines
Priest shuffling
Gypsy cop
Legal immunity
Impunity

References

External links 
 All Party Parliamentary Group on Extraordinary Rendition
 Rendition of Anthony Burns – notorious fugitive slave law incident
 Legal history of interstate rendition
 Outsourcing Torture, from The New Yorker, February 7, 2005
 2000 State Department list of renditions and extraditions – through 2000
 Alternatives to extradition – definition of rendition and extraordinary rendition used by the United States Department of Justice
 Friendly Renditions to Islamic Countries

Central Intelligence Agency operations
Criminal procedure
Extradition